David Jno Baptiste aka Ras Jumbo is a Caribbean bass guitar player based in Paris, France.

Background 
Baptiste learned to play guitar as a boy in Dominica where he was born. In the 1970s, he was involved in bands on the island playing French Creole music that originated in the archipelago formed from Guadeloupe to Martinique. The music known as "cadence" further developed into zouk. Baptiste, however, was deeply influenced by roots rock reggae which was at its peak with Bob Marley as the brightest star. After settling in France in the mid-1980s, Baptiste focused on reggae music playing with artists from Alpha Blondy to Tiken Jah Fakoly with whom he still tours.

Baptiste was awarded a gold album with Tiken Jah Fakoly and remains a leading figure on the French reggae scene.

References 

Dominica musicians
Living people
Year of birth missing (living people)